Villar Pellice (Vivaro-Alpine: Lo Vilar de Pèlis) is a comune (municipality) in the Metropolitan City of Turin in the Italian region Piedmont, located about  southwest of Turin.

Villar Pellice borders the following municipalities: Perrero, Prali, Angrogna, Bobbio Pellice, Torre Pellice, Rorà, Bagnolo Piemonte, and Crissolo.

Demographic evolution

References